David V. Brewer (born 1951) is an American lawyer and judge, who served as a justice of the Oregon Supreme Court from 2013 to 2017. He retired on June 30, 2017, and was succeeded by Rebecca Duncan.

Brewer was the Chief Judge of the Oregon Court of Appeals from 2004 to 2012. He was a judge on the Lane County Circuit Court from 1994 to 2000.

Brewer graduated from the University of Oregon School of Law in 1977. He was an attorney and partner at Lombard, Gardner, Honsowetz & Brewer in Eugene, Oregon, from 1978 to 1993, and President of the Lane County Bar Association from 1991 to 1992.

References

1951 births
Living people
Oregon Court of Appeals judges
Justices of the Oregon Supreme Court
People from Modesto, California
Politicians from Eugene, Oregon
Sonoma State University alumni
University of Oregon School of Law alumni
Lawyers from Eugene, Oregon